Žďárek is a municipality and village in Liberec District in the Liberec Region of the Czech Republic. It has about 200 inhabitants.

History
The first written mention of Žďárek is from 1600.

References

External links

Villages in Liberec District